António Borges d'Almeida (18 October 1898 – 24 September 1959) was a Portuguese horse rider. He competed in the 1924 Summer Olympics. In 1924, Borges and his horse Reginald won the bronze medal as part of the Portuguese show jumping team, after finishing fifth in the individual jumping competition.

References

External links
Profile

1898 births
1959 deaths
Equestrians at the 1924 Summer Olympics
Olympic bronze medalists for Portugal
Olympic equestrians of Portugal
Portuguese male equestrians
Show jumping riders
Olympic medalists in equestrian
Medalists at the 1924 Summer Olympics
People from Fornos de Algodres
Sportspeople from Guarda District